The Saint in New York is an American 1938 crime film, directed by Ben Holmes and adapted from Leslie Charteris's 1935 novel of the same name by Charles Kaufman and Mortimer Offner. After a police lieutenant is killed, the New York Police Department enlists gentleman criminal Simon Templar to fight criminal elements in the city.

Released by RKO Pictures, The Saint in New York marks the first screen appearance of Templar, also known as "The Saint". Louis Hayward stars as the title character, with Kay Sutton as his love interest. Alfred Hitchcock was initially discussed as a possible director for the film. This was the first of eight films in RKO's film series about The Saint. After being replaced in the series by George Sanders, Hayward would not play The Saint again until 1953 in Hammer Films production of The Saint's Return. There had not been a Saint film made in twelve  years.

Plot

Police Lieutenant Martin, an officer leading the fight against New York gangsters, is killed. Jake Irbell is arrested and charged with his murder, but has to be released when prosecution witnesses are either coerced into changing their testimony or simply disappear. A civilian crime commission demands action of the police commissioner, but he has no fresh ideas. William Valcross (Frederick Burton), a respected leading citizen and member of the commission, suggests they resort to drastic measures and recruit Simon Templar (Louis Hayward), the "Saint", a British amateur detective with a reputation for dealing with criminals outside the law. The commissioner reluctantly agrees to give the Saint free rein to do what he must.

Valcross spends months tracking the Saint down, following a trail of dead (criminal) bodies across Europe and South America. Templar is intrigued by the challenge and is given a list of six gangsters whose removal would hopefully bring peace to the city.

Disguised as a nun, the Saint kills Irbell just as he is about to shoot his most determined enemy, Inspector Henry Fernack (Jonathan Hale). (This differs from the original novel in which the Saint shoots an accused cop-killer in cold blood after the man walks free from court). As he works his way through the list, Templar learns that the mysterious "Big Fellow" is the mastermind who hides his identity by communicating with his underlings solely through Fay Edwards (Kay Sutton). Templar meets Fay, and they are attracted to each other. She saves his life twice when his recklessness gets him in trouble. The Saint disposes of the last of the six original targets, Hutch Rellin (Sig Ruman), leaving only their leader.

Fay has given her word not to divulge the Big Fellow's name, but agrees to point him out when she meets him the next morning at the bank where the profits of three years worth of crime have been kept. When Valcross happens by, Templar tells him why he is waiting there. Valcross starts to leave, but when Fay shows up, she recognizes him. He fatally shoots her before Templar guns down the Big Fellow. Valcross wanted Templar to kill his men so he would not have to share the loot.

Cast
Louis Hayward as Simon Templar
Kay Sutton as Fay Edwards
Sig Ruman as Hutch Rellin
Jonathan Hale as Inspector Henry Fernack
Jack Carson as Red Jenks, one of Hutch's men
Paul Guilfoyle as Hymie Fanro, another of Hutch's men
Frederick Burton as William Valcross
Ben Welden as  Boots "Pappy" Papinoff, one of the six gangsters
Charles Halton as Vincent Nather, Irbell's lawyer
Cliff Bragdon as Sebastian Lipke
Frank M. Thomas as Prosecutor
George Irving as Judge
Paul Fix as Phil Farrell - Doorman at the Silverclub
Edward LeSaint as Committee Member (uncredited)

Production
Hayward is generally praised for his portrayal of the Saint; his performance has been described as "a poor man’s... Orson Welles", considered "rakish" while staying faithful to Charteris' vision. However he was unable to repeat the role because he was signed to a multi-picture deal by Edward Small who wanted to make Hayward a star. After being replaced in the series by George Sanders (Sanders later being replaced by Hugh Sinclair), Hayward would return to the role 15 years later in 1953's The Saint's Return (known as The Saint's Girl Friday in the US).

In the RKO films, Templar's New York Police Department contact, Inspector Fernack, as played by Jonathan Hale, appeared four times, even in films not specifically set in New York;  Templar's British law enforcement foil, Inspector Teal of Scotland Yard, would appear in films set in Britain, played by different actors.

In 1937, Alfred Hitchcock met with Lillie Messinger of RKO. Hitchcock showed interest in coming to America and making The Saint in New York. Ultimately, the film was made a year later with Ben Holmes directing.

Reception
The film was extremely popular, making a profit of $195,000.

References

External links

1938 films
The Saint (Simon Templar)
American black-and-white films
Films directed by Ben Holmes
RKO Pictures films
American crime films
1938 crime films
1930s English-language films
1930s American films